The Newtown Borough Historic District is a  historic district in the borough of Newtown within the town of Newtown in Fairfield County, Connecticut.  There is a local historic district, and an overlapping district that was listed on the National Register of Historic Places in 1996.

The National Register district includes just a small part of the current borough, but about half of the original borough as it was first incorporated in 1824. 

The local historic district was smaller, but the Ram's Pasture and another property were added in 2009.  The district has a governance structure.

The district was designated as a historic district on the National Register of Historic Places (NRHP) in 1996.  The district area has buildings dating back from 1780. The district includes the separately NRHP-listed Glover House and Caleb Baldwin Tavern.

In 1996, the district included 225 contributing buildings, 2 other contributing structures, 1 contributing site, and 2 contributing objects. The one contributing site in the district is the "Ram's Pasture", a meadow that was common land.

Significant properties in the district include:
Glover House
Caleb Baldwin Tavern: The Baldwin Tavern is along the march route taken by French commander Rochambeau's troops in 1781 en route to Yorktown, Virginia and/or in 1782 during their return.  It was built c. 1763 and is a two-and-a-half-story house. It housed some of the army's officers in June 1781, en route to the Siege of Yorktown. It also an example of traditional 18th-century New England architecture, and retains some details from that time period.
17 Main Street, home of Arthur J. Smith, publisher of the Newtown Bee newspaper which began in 1877 (see accompanying photo #9)
Liberty Pole/Flagpole
Soldiers and Sailors Monument
Edmond Town Hall
Matthew Curtiss House, 44 Main Street, a museum of the Newtown Historical Society (see photo #1, left)
Gen. Daniel Baldwin House, 38 Main Street, a formal Georgian style building that contrasts to most of the other architecture (see photo #4)
Cyrenius H. Booth Library

In 2003, citizen protests and a petition of 700 residents led to re-siting of a planned communications tower so that it would not be visible from the historic district.

See also
March Route of Rochambeau's army
List of historic sites preserved along Rochambeau's route
National Register of Historic Places listings in Fairfield County, Connecticut

References

External links
Newtown Historical Society, including photo of Matthew Curtiss House
The Newtown Bee, community newspaper founded in 1877

Newtown, Connecticut
National Register of Historic Places in Fairfield County, Connecticut
Colonial Revival architecture in Connecticut
Italianate architecture in Connecticut
Historic districts in Fairfield County, Connecticut
Historic places on the Washington–Rochambeau Revolutionary Route
Historic districts on the National Register of Historic Places in Connecticut